Shahrak Rural District is in Eslamabad District of Parsabad County, Ardabil province, Iran. At the censuses of 2006 and 2011, its constituent villages were a part of the former Qeshlaq-e Shomali Rural District of the Central District. At the most recent census of 2016, the population of the rural district was 6,658 in 1,932 households, by which time Eslamabad District had been established with two rural districts. The largest of its 55 villages was Shahrak-e Gharbi, with 745 people.

References 

Parsabad County

Rural Districts of Ardabil Province

Populated places in Ardabil Province

Populated places in Parsabad County

fa:دهستان شهرک (پارس‌آباد)